Ecgred of Lindisfarne (or Egfrid) was Bishop of Lindisfarne from 830 until his death in 845.

Citations

References

External links 
 History of Norham St Cuthbert Church

845 deaths
Bishops of Lindisfarne
9th-century English bishops
Year of birth unknown